The Czech Republic participated in the 2010 Winter Olympics in Vancouver, British Columbia, Canada, sending 92 participants, the largest Czech team ever to appear at the Winter Olympics. The Czechs competed in the majority of events, except curling, skeleton and women's ice hockey. Hockey player Jaromír Jágr served as flag bearer at the opening ceremony.

The medal hopes were set on speed skater Martina Sáblíková, cross-country skier Lukáš Bauer, freestyle skier Tomáš Kraus and alpine skier Šárka Záhrobská. As for ice hockey team, the expectations were less ambitious than at previous Olympics and this became true when the Czech teams went out in the quarterfinals. The games of Vancouver were with six medals the most successful in history of independent Czech Republic, equalling the medal count of its predecessor Czechoslovakia from Sarajevo 1984 but surpassing it in quality. The most successful Czech participant (and also the flag bearer during the closing ceremony) was speed skater Martina Sáblíková with two gold and one bronze medal.

Medalists

Alpine skiing

Biathlon 

Men

Women

Bobsleigh

Cross-country skiing 

Distance
Men

Women

Sprint

Figure skating

The Czech Republic qualified two entrants in men's singles and one in ice dancing, for a total of four athletes.

Freestyle skiing 

Ski cross

Ice hockey

Men's tournament

Roster

Group play
The Czech Republic will play in Group B.
Round-robin
All times are local (UTC-8).

Standings

Final rounds
Qualification playoff

Quarterfinal

Luge

Nordic combined

Short track speed skating

Ski jumping

Snowboarding 

Halfpipe

Parallel GS

Snowboard cross

Speed skating

See also
 Czech Republic at the Olympics
 Czech Republic at the 2010 Winter Paralympics

References

2010 in Czech sport
Nations at the 2010 Winter Olympics
2010